Thomas Whelan (1898–1921) was an executed Irishman.

Thomas Whelan may also refer to:

Thomas J. Whelan (mayor) (1922–2002), mayor of Jersey City
Thomas J. Whelan (judge) (born 1940), United States federal judge
Tom Whelan (1894–1957), American football player

See also
 Whelan (disambiguation)